Alan Brahmst (born September 27, 1965) is a former international and Olympic field hockey player from Canada.

Brahmst was national coach from 2008–2010 and coached at the 2008 Beijing Olympics (assistant) and 2010 World Cup in Delhi (head coach)

Brahmst is a strategy & high performance consultant

International senior competitions
 1986 – World Cup, London (10th)
 1991 – Indoor World Cup, Glasgow (4th)
 1993 – Intercontinental Cup, Poznan (7th)
 1995 – Pan American Games, Mar del Plata (2nd)
 1996 – Olympic Qualifier, Barcelona (6th)
 1996 – World Cup Preliminary, Sardinia (2nd)
 1997 – World Cup Qualifier, Kuala Lumpur (5th)
 1998 – World Cup, Utrecht (8th)
 1999 – Sultan Azlan Shah Cup, Kuala Lumpur (4th)
 1999 – Pan American Games, Winnipeg (1st)
 2000 – Sultan Azlan Shah Cup, Kuala Lumpur (7th)
 2000 – Americas Cup, Cuba (2nd)
 2000 – Olympic Games, Sydney (10th)

References

External links
 
 
 
 
 
 

1965 births
Living people
Male field hockey defenders
Canadian male field hockey players
Canadian people of German descent
Field hockey players at the 2000 Summer Olympics
Olympic field hockey players of Canada
Field hockey players from Toronto
Field hockey players from Hamburg
Pan American Games gold medalists for Canada
Pan American Games silver medalists for Canada
Pan American Games medalists in field hockey
1998 Men's Hockey World Cup players
Field hockey players at the 1995 Pan American Games
Field hockey players at the 1999 Pan American Games
Medalists at the 1995 Pan American Games